Ashland Hills Hotel and Suites (formerly Ashland Hills and Windmill Inn) is a hotel and event venue in Ashland, Oregon, United States.

Description and history
The  site is among the largest hotels in Southern Oregon. The business was owned by Doug and Becky Neuman, as of 2014. Ashland Hills has mid-century modern decor.

See also
 Ashland Springs Hotel

References

External links

 
 

Buildings and structures in Ashland, Oregon
Hotels in Oregon
Mid-century modern
Modernist architecture in Oregon